is a 2014 Japanese crime drama film directed by Daihachi Yoshida and based on a novel by Mitsuyo Kakuta.

Cast
Rie Miyazawa
Sosuke Ikematsu
Satomi Kobayashi
Yuko Oshima
Seiichi Tanabe
Yoshimasa Kondo
Renji Ishibashi

Reception
It will be in competition at the 27th Tokyo International Film Festival. Rie Miyazawa was nominated for the Asian Film Award for Best Actress at the 9th Asian Film Awards.

References

External links
 

2014 films
2014 crime drama films
Films based on Japanese novels
Films directed by Daihachi Yoshida
Japanese crime drama films
2010s Japanese films
2010s Japanese-language films